Charles David Kelman (May 23, 1930June 1, 2004) was an American ophthalmologist, surgeon, inventor, jazz musician, entertainer, and Broadway producer. Known as the father of phacoemulsification, he developed many of the medical devices, instruments, implant lenses and techniques used in cataract surgery. In the early 1960s, he began the use of cryosurgery to remove cataracts and repair retinal detachments. Cryosurgery for cataracts remained in heavy use until 1978, when phacoemulsification, a procedure Kelman also developed in 1967, became the modern standard treatment. Kelman was given the National Medal of Technology by President George H. W. Bush and recognized as the Ophthalmologist of the Century by the International Congress of Cataract and Refractive Surgery in Montreal, Canada. He was also inducted into the National Inventors Hall of Fame in Akron, Ohio, and received the 2004 Lasker Award.

Born in New York, Kelman graduated from Tufts University and earned his medical degree from University of Geneva before returning to New York to intern at Kings County Hospital and complete his residency at Wills Eye Hospital in Philadelphia. He was later an attending surgeon at the Manhattan Eye, Ear & Throat Hospital and the New York Eye and Ear Infirmary, and maintained a private practice. Kelman served as clinical professor of ophthalmology at New York Medical College and individually taught his techniques to many surgeons around the world.

Kelman pursued a career as an entertainer alongside his medical career. He began playing the harmonica at a young age and performed on a radio show, The Horn and Hardart Children's Hour. He later learned to play the clarinet and saxophone. As a teenager, he formed a big band, began composing music, and played in his high school band and as first clarinet on the New York All-City Orchestra. While in medical school in Geneva, he appeared on two jazz radio shows and one on television. After returning to New York, he recorded a song, "Telephone Numbers", released by Chancellor Records to some success in national billboard charts. After inventing phacoemulsification, in part to promote the procedure, he began appearing regularly on television, first on The Tonight Show Starring Johnny Carson in 1975. He developed a musical comedy routine which he performed on television as well as in Atlantic City, Las Vegas, and Carnegie Hall in New York, alongside several notable jazz musicians and entertainers. He co-produced several Broadway musicals and wrote at least two off-Broadway musicals.

Early life and education 
Charles David Kelman was born on May 23, 1930, in Brooklyn, New York, to Eva and David Kelman. He grew up in East New York before the family moved to Forest Hills, Queens. His father was a Jewish immigrant from Greece who never received the proper compensation and recognition for his inventions, including the first tar-free cigarettes and cellophane Christmas wreaths. He inspired his son's desire to proudly seek recognition of his own inventions.

Charles began playing music at four years old, when he learned to play his first instrument, the harmonica. He began playing regularly for The Horn and Hardart Children's Hour radio show. Kelman also learned to play the saxophone and clarinet, receiving professional training from musicians in the big band era. While attending Forest Hills High School, he played in the high school band and as the first clarinet of the New York All-City Orchestra.

He dreamed of stardom in music, however, he said that, when he was 17 years old, his father told him to bring his saxophone to the basement of their house and play for him. Charles played a song by Jimmy Dorsey after which his father asked if he had played as well as Dorsey. When Charles admitted he had not, his father announced: "You'll be a doctor."

Kelman attended Boston's Tufts University and graduated in just two years to earn a B.S. degree in 1950. He then studied medicine at the University of Geneva and, after learning that his father was diagnosed with cancer, accelerated his studies with the hope of having his father see him becoming a doctor. He obtained his M.D. degree in 1956, but not before his father's death the year before. After interning at Kings County Hospital, he did his residency at Wills Eye Hospital in Philadelphia.

Career

As an ophthalmologist and surgeon 
In 1960, Kelman started an ophthalmology private practice and began to experiment with the use of cryosurgery. His first invention in 1962 was the cryoprobe which he used to freeze a cataractous lens before removal in intracapsular cataract extraction (ICCE), which removed the lens with the capsule intact. While the technique has not been in heavy use since 1978 and the advent of other techniques such as extracapsular cataract surgery (ECCE) which Kelman helped develop, ICCE remains a viable surgical option. In 1963, Kelman then developed the use of cryopexy to treat retinal detachment.

In 1964, he applied for a research grant from the John A. Hartford Foundation to further investigate freezing techniques in eye surgery and, in an addendum to the application, proposed "a method for removing a cataract through an incision small enough so that no hospitalization will be required." He received a three-year grant from the foundation. The idea for his next invention came to Kelman after seeing an ultrasonic device at his dentist's office. Kelman envisioned using a similar device that vibrates to break up a cataractous lens and remove it without a large incision.

Kelman named the procedure phacoemulsification, a technique that has become standard treatment for cataracts. With medical instrument manufacturer Cavitron (which was later acquired by Coopervision), he devised an ultrasonic surgical instrument with an aspiration and irrigation system. He began testing the procedure on animals in April 1966. In 1967, Kelman secretly conducted his first surgery on a blind patient, awaiting enucleation, who volunteered knowing that the procedure would not bring back his vision. His first patient's eye became infected and was removed. However, he was successful on subsequent attempts. He had made further improvements on the instrument, increasing the vibration speed from 20,000 cycles per second to 40,000 cycles per second and creating a smaller hand instrument. On July 25, 1967, Kelman and his co-inventor Anton Banko filed a patent application to register a phacoemulsification device for cataract surgery. Kelman began a novel business relationship with the manufacturer to produce the device.

After publishing "Phaco-emulsification and Aspiration—A New Technique for Cataract Removal: A Preliminary Report" in the American Journal of Ophthalmology, he began teaching courses to surgeons interested in learning this new technique. One of his students was Eric Arnott, a British ophthalmologist who introduced the procedure to the UK. This new surgery method removed the need for an extended hospital stay and made the surgery less painful. The technique and similar tools have also been adopted and used in neurosurgery to remove tumors from the brain and spinal cord, and subsequently ushered a trend of minimally-invasive outpatient surgical procedures.

Phacoemulsification initially faced significant criticism and skepticism in the 1970s. The National Eye Institute labeled the procedure as experimental, allowing insurance companies not to cover the procedure. Kelman's critics said the procedure was "ridiculous" or "malpractice". At 1973 Welsh Cataract Symposium, surgeons presented results of negative outcomes from the procedure with actual patients paraded as evidence. In 1974, the American Academy of Ophthalmology (AAO) sponsored a comparative study of phacoemulsification, which found that the procedure was as effective as ICCE. Kelman decided to promote the procedure to the general public and, on February 21, 1975, appeared on The Tonight Show with Johnny Carson. The first International Congress on Phacoemulsification and Cataract Methodology sponsored by Foundation for Ophthalmic Education was held the same year and the procedure began to gain wider acceptance.

While Kelman in 1975 began developing IOL that could fit in smaller incisions, this issue was only overcome when Thomas R. Mazzocco invented the silicone IOL in the early 1980s. What became known as the "Mazzocco taco" could be folded and inserted in the same small incision used for phacoemulsification. When the foldable IOL was approved for use by the Food and Drug Administration in 1984, the clear advantage of Kelman's phacoemulsification was fully realized. That same year, the Kelman Satellite Teleconference was presented at the annual AAO conference, allowing the more than 400 in attendance to observe a live broadcast of Kelman performing five procedures.

Kelman treated many celebrities including Joe Frazier, Lionel Hampton, Rex Harrison, Ann Miller, Jan Peerce, and William B. Williams. Hedy Lamarr, who Kelman treated in October 1980, said "I was blind for more than seven years. But I'm fine now. Dr. Kelman gave me my sight back. He gave me my eyes." In 1992, The New York Times estimated that Kelman's innovation "shaved $7 billion a year from the nation's hospital bill." At various times in his career, Kelman served as clinical professor of ophthalmology at New York Medical College and as an attending surgeon at the Manhattan Eye, Ear & Throat Hospital and the New York Eye and Ear Infirmary. He published numerous articles, papers, and scientific book chapters, as well as a lay book, Cataracts: What You Must Know About Them, published by Crown Publishers in 1982. Later in his career, he invented a way to create collagen from a patient's skin to avoid allergic reactions. He continued to practice medicine, perform surgery, and teach alongside his career as an entertainer. Kelman held more than 100 patents for his instruments and innovations, and became known as the father of phacoemulsification. Cataract surgery with phacoemulsification is one of the most common surgeries in the world with more than 9.5 million such procedures performed each year around the world as of 2011.

As an entertainer 
Kelman began composing music in high school and started a big band as a teenager. He continued his musical pursuits throughout his college education. While attending medical school in Geneva, he regularly performed on two jazz radio shows and another on television. He co-wrote "Le Petit Déjeuner (Paroles et Musique de François Charpin et Charles Kelman)" which was later recorded by the French singer Jean Sablon.

Using the stage name Kerry Adams, he recorded "Telephone Numbers", which was released by Chancellor Records to some success in national billboard charts in 1960. The song's success was cut short by the craze created by "The Twist" that would change the pop music genre. After this, Kelman believed his singing career had come to an end and began to focus on his medical career.

Just as his medical practice flourished, Kelman's celebrity grew after appearing on The Tonight Show Starring Johnny Carson in 1975, where he sang a song about a blind girl and promoted his surgical innovations. He continued to appear regularly on television shows hosted by Merv Griffin, Barbara Walters, Oprah Winfrey and David Letterman. As well as singing and playing the saxophone, he developed a musical comedy routine which he also performed in Atlantic City and Las Vegas, opening for or performing alongside the Spinners, Glen Campbell, James Darren, Dizzy Gillespie, Lionel Hampton and Regis Philbin. He also rented out Carnegie Hall for several benefit concerts in the mid 1970s.

Kelman co-produced several musicals on Broadway, including Can-Can (1981), Triumph of Love (1997), and The Sound of Music (1998–1999), and was a member of the Friars Club in New York. He recorded an album, Moonlight Serenade, released in 1992 by Columbia Records. The Marrano, a musical he wrote based on a premise that the Italian explorer Christopher Columbus was Jewish, also previewed in Cape Cod in 1992. His latest musical, The Right Pair of Shoes, was due to premiere in 2004 at the Caldwell Theatre in Boca Raton, Florida.

Awards and honors 

In 1970, Kelman was awarded by the American Academy of Achievement. In 1982, he was a recipient of the Congressional Salute in the U.S. Senate, 97th Congress, in Washington, D.C. In 1985, Kelman presented the first American Society of Cataract and Refractive Surgery (ASCRS) Innovator's Lecture. The lecture series was named in his honor in 2003. He also delivered the ASCRS's Binkhorst Lecture in 1989, the Ridley Medal Lecture at the International Congress of Ophthalmology in 1990, and the Arthur J. Bedell Memorial Lecture at Wills Eye Hospital in 1991.

In June 1992, Kelman was awarded the National Medal of Technology from President George H. W. Bush. The same year, he had received the Distinguished Service Award from Tufts University and the Inventor of the Year Award from the New York Patent, Trademark and Copyright Law Association. At the July 1994 International Congress of Cataract and Refractive Surgery in Montreal, Canada, he was recognized as the Ophthalmologist of the Century.

In 1999, Kelman was selected as one of the ten most influential ophthalmologists of the 20th century by the ASCRS and became president of the society. The following year, he received a Doctor of Letters from Thomas Jefferson University's Wills Eye Hospital Retina Service and the hospital also named its research facility the Charles D. Kelman Laboratory and Library. In 2003, Kelman received the Laureate Recognition Award from the AAO and the annual AAO Charles D. Kelman Lecture was established in 2005. In February 2004, he was inducted into the National Inventors Hall of Fame in Akron, Ohio. He was also awarded the 2004 Lasker Award, with the jury making an exception to the rules to allow the award to be given posthumously.

In January 2010, the New York public television station WLIW aired a documentary titled Through My Eyes: The Charlie Kelman Story; his autobiography published in 1985 was also titled Through My Eyes.

Personal life and death 
Kelman was an avid golfer and learned to fly a helicopter later in life. He and his first wife Joan Kelman (later Bernstein) had three children: David Joseph (who died in 2003), Lesley, and Jennifer. With his second wife Ann, he had three sons: Evan, Jason, and Seth. In 1996, Kelman moved to Boca Raton, where he died of lung cancer on June 1, 2004, at the age of 74.

References 

1930 births
2004 deaths
20th-century American Jews
20th-century surgeons
21st-century American Jews
American ophthalmologists
American surgeons
Deaths from lung cancer in Florida
Forest Hills High School (New York) alumni
Musicians from Brooklyn
National Medal of Technology recipients
Physicians from New York City
Recipients of the Lasker-DeBakey Clinical Medical Research Award